Gerlos is a municipality with 793 inhabitants (as of Jan. 2019) in Schwaz district of the Austrian state of Tyrol. The village is popular with skiing tourists, mainly families, as there is easy access to  Zillertal Arena Centre on Isskogel. The village lies in the Zell am Ziller judicial district.

The municipality of Gerlos has seven districts: Au, Gmünd, Innertal, Mitterhof, Oberhof, Ried and Schwarzach.

Geography
Gerlos is located in the :de:Gerlostal, which is a side valley of the Zillertal, branching to the east near Zell am Ziller. Gerlos consists of several hamulated located along the :de:Gerlospass on the floor of the valley, at an altitude of around 1200m. To the south, the side valleys of :de:Schwarzach, :de:Wimmerbach, and :de:Schönach lead to the Zillertal Alps, which are over 3000 meters tall. To the north, there is a ski area on the Kitzbuhel Alps.

The municipal area of Gerlos has an area of approximately 120km2. A third of this is forested, a quarter is High Alpine, and the rest are alpine pastures. Three percent of the area is used for agriculture.

History 
In the 9th Century, the Archbishop of Salzburg acquired large estates in the Zillertal, and the only direct connection between Salzburg and its Tyrolean territories was a mule track. In the 14th Century, several tax-paying Schwaighöfe (livestock and dairy producing farms) were established in Gmünd, Ried, and Oberhof.

Until the erection of a Gothic filial church in 1470, Gerlos was part of the parish of Zell am Ziller. St Lambert's tower and Leonhard church were built circa 1500. The parish church in Gerlos today still contains its substructure, up to the octagonal attachment. The other parts of Gerlos' church were built in 1735 by :de:Hans Holzmeister. Gerlos became a parish in 1891.

Gerlos was first mentioned in a 1507 document as "saltus gerlaise" (Gerlos Pass). The valley and place name "gerlaise" is probably derived from the words "ger", meaning "pointed property", and "laise", a wild stream. Gerlos' forests are also referenced in the same year, under the name "silvam cui nomen Gerleis".

The area experienced a high when gold was discovered in the neighbouring towns of Hainzenberg and Zell am Ziller. Gold was also discovered in Gerlos itself, where it was mined from the 17th century up to 1870. The Gerlos Pass also played an important role in the Tyrolean Rebellion of 1809, when troops from Pinzgau invaded Tyrol. 

Although the pass had been, for many centuries, the most important route from Tyrol to Salzburg, there were plans for the construction of a new road as early as 1630, although this never materialised: the roads were still in poor condition in late in the 19th century. In 1866, the "Bote für Tirol" wrote that Gerlos roads had road gradients of 20%, bumpy pavements, rutted tracks over rock ground, and sharp bends. During this period, construction of a railway line had been planned, but this never happened. When construction of a new road began in 1910, huge problems were experienced due to landslide and loosing of the soil. A new road on the Salzburg side was only completed in 1962, by Franz Wallach, the builder of the Grossglockner High Alpine Road. It was another two years before the road on the Tyrolean side was passable.The Funsingau Hydroelectric power plant was also completed around this time.

The population of Gerlos has been increasing since its founding, although the population has fluctuated in recent times.

Culture 

Gerlos has 5 culturally significant buildings, for example the Gerlos parish church (pictured)

Economy and Infrastructure

Tourism 
In addition to electricity generation by the Fusingau power plant and farming, ski tourism plays a key role in the village's economy, as Gerlos has the third highest number of winter overnight stays per year in the ZIllertal, after Mayrhofen and Tux. From 2010 to 2019, the number of overnight stays increased from 590,000 to 670,000. The main ski season is busiest in February, with 125,000 overnight stays.  Summer months are also busy, in particular August with 774,000 overnight stays (in 2019)

The skiing season of 2020 was severely impacted by the COVID-19 pandemic - stays over the entire year totaled 486,444, with February overnights being reduced to only 139,347.

Traffic 
The main road through Gerlos is the :de:Gerlosstrasse, which connects Zell am Ziller to Mittersill. There is a seasonal bus service from Zell am Ziller at the Zillertalbahn train station.

Sports 

 Swimming in the Durlassboden reservoir
 Hiking in the Kitzbuelher Alps
 Via ferrata in :de:Riederklamm
 Mountain biking
 Piste skiing in the Zillertal Arena
 Ski touring

Politics

Local Council 
Eleven representatives are elected to the municipal council.

Mayorship

 1974–1992 Johann Kammerlander
 1992–2009 Franz Hörl (ÖVP)
 since 2009 Andreas Haas

Coat of Arms 
The municipal coat of arms of Gerlos was created in 1985. It primarily depicts a griffin, which is the result of the merging of the heraldic animals of Salzburg and Tyrol, the eagle and the lion. This represents the location of the community, being on the border of the states, and also represents the ties to the local archbishopship of Salzburg,

Notable People

Honorary Citizens 

 Berthold Beitz (1913-2013) - cofounder of the Zillertal ski area.
 Peter Haas (1927-2017) - a longtime Kapellmeister and Choirmaster in the village.
 Johann Kammerlander (1926-2017) - former mayor of Gerlos, restaurateur.

Gerlos born 

 :de:Simon Geisler (1686-1931), politician

Associated 

 Anja Haas, (born 1971) -  alpine skier, trains in the village
 :de:Franz Hörl (born 1956) - politician, runs a hotel in the village.

External Links 
Statistics Austria - local statistics for Gerlos here.

Village Website

More on the village historyl

References

Kitzbühel Alps
Cities and towns in Schwaz District